Rüfüs Du Sol, stylised as RÜFÜS DU SOL and formerly known as simply Rüfüs (stylized RÜFÜS) from 2010 to 2018, are an Australian alternative dance group from Sydney, that consists of Tyrone Lindqvist, Jon George and James Hunt. Their debut album Atlas peaked at number one in Australia, while their second album Bloom debuted atop the Australian albums chart in early 2016. Their single "You Were Right" won the ARIA Award for Best Dance Release in 2015. While still known as Rüfüs elsewhere, they performed as Rüfüs Du Sol in the United States because Rufus was already taken. In 2018 they changed their name to Rüfüs Du Sol internationally.

They have performed at the Byron Bay Bluesfest in NSW in 2013, Byron Bay's Splendour in the Grass in 2014, Electric Forest Festival at Double JJ Resort in 2016 and 2018, Mountain Sounds in 2017 in NSW, Coachella in 2016, 2017, and 2019, as well as Lollapalooza Chicago and Field Day on New Years Day in Sydney in 2019.

Career

2010–2012: Formation 
The band formed consisting of Jon George, Tyrone Lindqvist and James Hunt in November 2010. On 1 January 2011 they released their debut EP Rüfüs. "We Left" their debut single was released on 25 July 2011. Two tracks from the EP, "Paris Collides" and "We Left" reached Nos. 8 and 13 on the Hype Machine charts simultaneously, while the video for "We Left" was nominated as one of 12 finalists internationally in the 2012 Vimeo awards for best music video.

In April 2012 they released their second EP Blue. The double A-sided single "This Summer"/"Selena" was released on 16 July 2012.

2013–2014: Atlas 

Their debut studio album, Atlas, was released on 9 August 2013. It debuted at number 1 on the Australian Albums Chart on 25 August 2013. It was preceded by "Take Me" as the lead single on 8 March 2013, and "Desert Night" as the second single on 2 August 2013. "Tonight" was released as the third single 22 November 2013, followed by "Sundream" as the fourth single on 21 March 2014.

2015–2017: Bloom 

In June 2015, RÜFÜS released "You Were Right", the lead single from their forthcoming second album. It peaked at number 22 on the Australian ARIA Singles Chart and was certified double platinum. The album Bloom was released in January 2016 and become the band's second number-one album.

2018–2020: Solace and Solace Remixed 

In May 2018, the band changed its Australian name to Rüfüs Du Sol. Lead singer Tyrone Lindqvist explained the name change: "I guess we don't really know any other bands that have two names throughout the entire world so it just seemed fitting." They released "No Place" on 25 May 2018. They later released the singles "Underwater" and "Lost in My Mind", along with announcing their third album Solace. A remix album was released in September 2019. At the ARIA Music Awards of 2019, Solace was nominated for three ARIA Music Awards.

2021: Surrender

On 13 July 2021, the band released "Alive"; their first song in three years. In a press statement, frontman Tyrone Lindqvist said "It's a heavier song in some ways, but at its core it's hopeful." "Next to Me" was released on 11 August 2021. Jon George said it "is a song of devotion, caring compassion and pure love." On 24 September 2021, they released the single "On My Knees". On the same day, they also announced their fourth studio album, Surrender, which was released on 21 October 2021. In October 2022, the band launched Mate Maker Co., a line of hard kombucha drinks, with the help of Justin Medcraft, ex-global senior brand manager at Diageo and brand director at Pabst Brewing co, their artist manager Danny Robson, and drinks trade expert Tom Appleton.

Band members
 Tyrone Lindqvist – vocals, guitar
 Jon George – keyboards
 James Hunt – drums

Discography

Studio albums

Live albums

Remix albums

Extended plays

Singles

Other charted songs

Music videos

Awards and nominations

AIR Awards 
The Australian Independent Record Awards (commonly known informally as AIR Awards) is an annual awards night to recognise, promote and celebrate the success of Australia's Independent Music sector.

|-
| rowspan="2"| AIR Awards of 2013
| RÜFÜS
| Carlton Dry Global Music Grant
| 
|-
| "Take Me"
| Best Independent Dance/Electronica or Club Single
| 
|-
| rowspan="3"| AIR Awards of 2014
| rowspan="2"| Atlas
| Best Independent Album
| 
|-
| Best Independent Dance, Electronica Album
| 
|-
| "Sundream"
| Best Independent Dance, Electronica or Club Single
| 
|-
| AIR Awards of 2015
| "You Were Right"
| Best Independent Dance, Electronica or Club Single
| 
|}

APRA Awards
The APRA Awards are held in Australia and New Zealand by the Australasian Performing Right Association to recognise songwriting skills, sales and airplay performance by its members annually. Rüfüs Du Sol has been nominated for one award.

|-
| 2020
| "Treat You Better"
| Most Performed Dance Work of the Year
| 
|-

ARIA Music Awards 

The annual ARIA Music Awards have been presented since 1987 by the Australian Recording Industry Association (ARIA). RÜFÜS/Rüfüs Du Sol have won four awards from twenty nominations.

|-
| rowspan="2"| 2013 || rowspan="2"| Atlas || Breakthrough Artist – Release ||  
|-
| Best Dance Release ||  
|-
| rowspan="3"| 2014 || rowspan="2"| "Sundream" || Best Group || 
|-
| Best Dance Release || 
|-
| Words Within Worlds Tour || Best Australian Live Act ||  
|-
| 2015 || "You Were Right" || Best Dance Release ||  
|-
| rowspan="5"| 2016 ||rowspan="3"| Bloom || Album of the Year ||  
|-
| Best Group ||  
|-
| Best Dance Release ||  
|-
| Bloom Tour || Best Australian Live Act ||  
|-
| Jack Vanzet for RÜFÜS' Bloom|| Best Cover Art ||  
|-
| rowspan="2"| 2018 ||rowspan="2"| "No Place" || Best Group ||  
|-
| Best Dance Release ||  
|-
| rowspan="3"| 2019||rowspan="3"| Solace  || Album of the Year ||  
|-
| Best Group || 
|-
| Best Dance Release ||  
|-
| 2020 || 2019 Summer Festival Tour || Best Australian Live Act ||  
|-
| rowspan="2"| 2021||rowspan="2"| "Alive"  || Best Group ||  
|-
| Best Dance Release || 
|-
| rowspan="7"| 2022
| rowspan="3"| Surrender
| Album of the Year
| 
|-
| Best Group
| 
|-
| Best Dance/Electronic Release 
| 
|-
| rowspan="2"| "On My Knees"
| Best Pop Release
| 
|-
| Song of the Year
| 
|-
| "I Don't Wanna Leave" – Rüfüs Du Sol, Katzki
| Best Video
| 
|-
| Cassian for Rüfüs Du Sol Surrender
| Mix Engineer – Best Mixed Album
| 
|-
|}

Electronic Music Awards 
The Electronic Music Awards is an annual award show with an emphasis on the electronic music genre. It commenced in 2017. Rüfüs Du Sol have won two awards from three nominations.

Grammy Awards 
The Grammy Awards are an annual award ceremony presented by The Recording Academy, recognising achievements in the music industry.

! scope="col" style="width:6%;"| 
|-
| rowspan="2"| 2020
| Solace
| Best Dance/Electronic Album
| 
|rowspan=2| 
|-
| "Underwater"
| rowspan=3| Best Dance Recording
| 
|-
| 2022
| "Alive"
| 
| 
|-
| rowspan="2"| 2023
| "On My Knees"
| 
|rowspan=2| 
|-
| Surrender
| Best Dance/Electronic Album
| 
|}

J Awards
The J Awards are an annual series of Australian music awards that were established by the Australian Broadcasting Corporation's youth-focused radio station Triple J. They commenced in 2005.

! 
|-
| J Awards of 2013
|Atlas
| Australian Album of the Year
| 
|
|-
| J Awards of 2018
| Solace
| Australian Album of the Year
| 
| 
|-
| J Awards of 2021
| Surrender
| Australian Album of the Year
| 
|

National Live Music Awards
The National Live Music Awards (NLMAs) are a broad recognition of Australia's diverse live industry, celebrating the success of the Australian live scene. The awards commenced in 2016.

|-
| rowspan="2"| National Live Music Awards of 2016
| rowspan="2"| Themselves
| Live Electronic Act (or DJ) of the Year
| 
|-
| International Live Achievement (Group)
| 
|-
| rowspan="2"|National Live Music Awards of 2019
| rowspan="2"| Themselves
| Live Electronic Act (or DJ) of the Year
| 
|-
| International Live Achievement (Group)
| 
|-

Rolling Stone Australia Awards
The Rolling Stone Australia Awards are awarded annually in January or February by the Australian edition of Rolling Stone magazine for outstanding contributions to popular culture in the previous year.

! 
|-
| rowspan="3"| 2022
| Rüfüs Du Sol
| Rolling Stone Readers' Choice Award
| 
| rowspan="3"|
|-
| Rüfüs Du Sol
| Rolling Stone Global Award
| 
|-
| "Alive"
| Best Single
| 
|-
| 2023
| Rüfüs Du Sol
| Rolling Stone Global Award
| 
| 
|-

Notes

References

External links
 
 

2010 establishments in Australia
ARIA Award winners
Australian electronic dance music groups
Musical groups established in 2010
Musical groups from Sydney
Sony Music Australia artists